The Fengshuba Dam is a concrete gravity dam on the Dong River in Longchuan County, Guangdong Province, China. The primary purpose of the dam is hydroelectric power generation and it has an installed capacity of 150 MW. Construction on the dam began in May 1970, the first generator was operational in December 1973 and the second in November 1974.

See also

List of dams and reservoirs in China
List of major power stations in Guangdong

References

Dams in China
Hydroelectric power stations in Guangdong
Gravity dams
Dams completed in 1974